Ishdavletovo (İşdäwlät) is a rural locality (a village) in Starosubkhangulovsky Selsoviet, Burzyansky District, Bashkortostan, Russia. The population was 29 as of 2010. There are 4 streets.

Geography 
Ishdavletovo is located 7 km south of Starosubkhangulovo (the district's administrative centre) by road. Starosubkhangulovo is the nearest rural locality.

References 

Rural localities in Burzyansky District